Love Blossoms II (simplified Chinese: 心花朵朵开 II) is the second part of the long-running Chinese drama produced by Singapore's free-to-air channel, MediaCorp Channel 8. It stars Chen Shucheng , Ivy Lee , Felicia Chin , Zhang Yaodong , Terence Cao , Zheng Geping & Chew Chor Meng as the casts of the series. It is the sequel of Love Blossoms. It is shown on weekdays at 7pm.

Part 1 consisted of 58 episodes, while Part 2 had 55 episodes. From 2 January 2009, two episodes were aired in a two-hour slot on Fridays from 1900 hours to 2100 hours.

Cast

Tao Family

Yun Family

Pan Family

Yu Family

Wang Family

Other Casts

Minor characters

Music

Synopsis

Tao family
Although Linglan (Constance Song) and Wenhao (Terence Cao) are reunited with the family, Dashun (Chen Shucheng) is unable to bask in family bliss. Wenhao is unable to assimilate into the family as he feels that Dashun acknowledged him only because his mother has died. Lu Gua's (Chen Tianwen) greed and laziness irks Haitong (Felicia Chin) and they get into frequent confrontations because of Tao Nursery.

When Wenzhu's (Ya Hui) condition improves after rest. She decides to further her studies abroad. Wenhao takes the opportunity to announce that he has to go to Australia to settle his mother's estate. With his children leaving him one by one, Dashun feels a sense of loss especially when Zijing is missing.

Without Daji (Zhang Yaodong) helping her, Haitong has to manage Tao Garden and E28, the hamper-selling branch of Tao Garden, on her own. Her ex-boyfriend Zipeng (Adam Chen) tries to rekindle their relationship and although Haitong makes it clear that she is not interested, Zipeng joins E28 on the pretext that he is protecting Haitong from Lu Gua's bullying.

When Daji returns, he is not pleased with Zipeng's presence but respects Haitong's arrangement.

Wenhao returns from Australia feeling that his parents had not genuinely loved him. He suggests that Dashun mortgage his house to buy Tao Garden for him. Dashun is reluctant and Wenhao decides to leave home.

Daji's aunt Daisy (Aileen Tan) returns to Singapore after leaving from her job in the USA. She does not get along well with Haitong due to her previous cohabitation with Zipeng.

Before Linglan's daughter Yiling (Chen Chuxuan) leaves for farther studies in Australia, Lu Gua sneaks into her room and tries to start sexual activities with her. In a fit of anger, Linglan drives Lu Gua away.

Zipeng loses all his possessions in the stock market and is desperate for money. With Lu Gua's help, he kidnaps Haitong, but when her claustrophobia acts up, he releases her without demanding a ransom. When he is chased by the police, he commits suicide, slitting his throat.

After the incident with Lu Gua, Yiling's behaviour goes from bad to worse. At a party, her cocktail was drugged, and she was pictured nude. She beat the boy who had raped her to a pulp.

Linglan wants to leave the country with Yiling, but Dashun chides her, advising her to turn her in to the police. Linglan is saddened but agrees with Dashun that it is the best decision.

Haitong and Daji eventually marry despite the tough test their relationship went through. Haitong realizes that she has a heart ailment when she is pregnant and faces the possibility of an abortion.

Wenhao contracts liver cirrhosis which might develop into liver failure. When Dashun donates part of his liver to him, Wenhao realises that Dashun loves him after all.

Yun family
Zijing (Ivy Lee) was in a coma for three months after her accident. When she regains consciousness, she realizes that she has been saved by Wang Zhongkun (Chew Chor Meng). Zijing is desolate, not knowing what the future holds for her and is reluctant to return home in an undignified state. Zhongkun, a victim of a gambling addiction, decides to help her re-establish her confidence.

When Zijing and Kaiwang (Zheng Geping) meet again, he pleads for a reunion. Zijing does not want to live in an insecure future. Kaiwang does not understand and, coupled with Caixia's (Patricia Mok) instigation, misunderstands that Zijing and Zhongkun are on intimate terms. Their matrimonial harmony is at stake.

Pressured by Caixia's tight scrutiny, Qingxiong (Rayson Tan) invests his savings in a gem mine and is cheated. He runs off, abandoning his family and business.

With her husband leaving behind massive debts, Caixia turns to her family for help. Little did she know that she had angered them one time too many. They refuse to help her, and Caixia is left to work for her own food and lodging.

Kaiwang works hard to clear his financial problems hoping to attain Zijing's approval. Coincidentally, Zhongkun is diagnosed with Spinocerebellar ataxia, a terminal illness. Zijing is at a loss on whether to return to Kaiwang or stay to look after Zhongkun.

Suddenly, Qingxiong returns and pleads for his wife's forgiveness. Jason pleads along but never gives up. He tricks Caixia into coming into his house and Caixia accepts him.
 
Zijing decides the go overseas with Zhongkun. Kaiwang is extremely sad but accepts her decision. However, Feifei secretly pleads Zhongkun not to take Zijing away from her. Zhongkun is devastated when Feifei tells him it is better for him to suffer rather than the whole Yun family.

Zhongkun leaves his home secretly, without Zijing's knowledge, the next day. He settles down in a nursing home where he is reconciled with Zhonghui, who tells him that he was now part of their family. Kaiwang meets with Zhongkun and arranges for Zijing to send him and Zhongmin off to the airport.

Zijing decides to return to Kaiwang on the advise of Dashun, Linglan, Haitong and Daji.  She packed her bags and quietly returned to Kaiwang's flat, not knowing that a surprise party had been planned for her.

After all they have gone through, Caixia and Qingxiong have changed for the better. They are forgiven by Kaiwang, Zijing and Baozuan. Not long after, Zijing is found to be pregnant. She gives birth to twin boys, to the delight of Kaiwang and Baozuan.

Pan family
Jiaqi (Yvonne Lim) is Kaiwang's new neighbour and lives with her father Old Peter (Richard Low) and brother Jiaqiang (Cavin Soh). Jiaqiang falls in love with Erbo (Priscelia Chan) and constantly teams up with his father to tease Caixia, who bullies Erbo frequently.

Jiaqi's friend Fan Fan (Vivian Lai) co-owns a bakery with Jiaqi and falls in love with Wenhao, who turns out to be her ex-classmate. Old Peter 'approves' of Wenhao when he first sees him and takes advantage of Erbo and Jiaqiang's wedding to bring he and Jiaqi closer.

After Erbo and Jiaqiang come back from their honeymoon, Old Peter is found to have senile dementia. Baozuan is employed to take care of Old Peter when Jiaqiang and Jiaqi are at work.

While tidying up Old Peter's room, Jiaqi finds evidence that she is not Old Peter's real daughter. Her real father turns up to be Wang Fa (Hong Guorui), the father of Zhigang (Ben Yeo), Wenzhu's ex-boyfriend.

When Wenhao first suggested that Wang Fa could be frauding, Jiaqi is displeased. However, after secretly removing a strand of his hair from his flat and sending it for DNA testing, she finds that Wenhao was right about Wang Fa. She reports Wang Fa to the police for fraud.

Jiaqi and Wenhao fall in love and marry. Fan Fan is not best pleased but accepts that Wenhao and Jiaqi love each other.

Overall
Lu Gua was caught by the police when he tried to extort money from Linglan. He was sentenced to death for drug-trafficking, rape, attempted murder and possession of gay pornographic materials (obscenity). Linglan is happy that she and Yiling were rid of him at last.

On Christmas Day, the Tao, Yun and Pan families gather at Dashun's house for a celebration. Yiling had been released from prison and Wenzhu was back with a new boyfriend. There were four babies present, Kaiwang and Zijing's twins, Haitong and Daji's son and Jiaqiang and Erbo's daughter Ziqing. When they were about to toast to the unity of their families, Wenhao announces that Jiaqi was pregnant. The whole house was full of joy as love blossomed among them.

Far away in Switzerland, Zhongkun, racked with atrophy, held up a drawing of Zijing he had made earlier, before he had learnt of his disease. He could only manage to hold it upside down. He wept as he thought of Zijing and her happy family many miles away back in Singapore.

Production notes
 This drama was given a two-hour slot from 7pm-9pm on Fridays and is one of the few dramas to be given two slots on weekdays (another includes The Little Nyonya).
 In the midst of filming, the actor playing Wang Zhongkun, Chew Chor Meng, was diagnosed with Kennedy's disease, causing him to limp. On Dec 19, 2008, he confirmed this during a church event, admitting that he had hid his disease from the public since September 2008.
 Xin Hua Hua (portrayed by Alaric Tay), a "noose" anchor of comedy-satire The Noose from season six, spoofed the Chinese name of the series.

2010 accolades

Star Awards 2010

See also 
List of programmes broadcast by Mediacorp Channel 8.
Love Blossoms

References

External links 
Official Website

Singapore Chinese dramas
2008 Singaporean television series debuts
2009 Singaporean television series endings
Mandarin-language television shows
2008 Singaporean television seasons
2009 Singaporean television seasons
Channel 8 (Singapore) original programming